Dabilpur is a village in Medchal mandal of Rangareddi district, Telangana, India.

Features
 It is well connected with Railway station. There are local train services from Secunderabad via. Malkajgiri, Alwal, Bolarum, Medchal to Manoharabad.
 Regular local TSRTC bus services from Secunderabad.
 There is a Krisna Balram temple at Dabilpur maintained by International Society for Krishna Consciousness (ISKCON). Swami Prabhupada stayed here for a year here.
 State Bank of India has a branch in Dabilpur.
 a Village Lingapur is located near to it, which divides by a pond called "Dabilpur cheruvu"

References

Villages in Ranga Reddy district